Yanacocha (possibly from Quechua yana black, qucha lake, "black lake") is a  mountain in the Vilcanota mountain range in the Andes of Peru. It is located in the Cusco Region, Canchis Province, Checacupe District. Yanacocha lies southwest of the glaciated area of Quelccaya (Quechua for "snow plain"), north of the Huancane River.

References

Mountains of Peru
Mountains of Cusco Region